The Cango Wildlife Ranch is a wildlife ranch 3 kilometres north of the town of Oudtshoorn in South Africa.

It was established in 1977 as a crocodile show farm.

References

External links

 Official website

Nature conservation in South Africa